Aggius (Gallurese: Agghju, Sardinian: Azos) is  a comune (municipality) in the Province of Sassari in the Italian region Sardinia, located about  north of Cagliari and about  west of Olbia.

Aggius borders the following municipalities: Aglientu, Bortigiadas, Tempio Pausania, Trinità d'Agultu e Vignola, Viddalba.

References

External links
 Official website

Cities and towns in Sardinia